Daasi is a 1952 Indian Telugu-language drama film, produced by C. Lakshmi Rajyam under the Rajyam Pictures banner and directed by C. V. Ranganatha Das, while L. V. Prasad has taken care of supervision. It stars N. T. Rama Rao, C. Lakshmi Rajyam and S. V. Ranga Rao, with music composed by C. R. Subburaman & Susarla Dakshina Murthy. The film was later remade in Tamil as Velaikari Magal by the same banner and director.

Plot
Ramaiah (N.T. Rama Rao) is a horse-cart driver and his wife Lakshmi (Lakshmi Rajyam) works as a maid at the house of a wealthy man, Badrinath (S. V. Ranga Rao). The couple has a son, Subbadu. Badrinath, who is issueless, decides to remarry to have children and is in search of a bride. His wife Parvathamma (Santhakumari) is advised by her elder brother Ramarao (Srivatsa) to fake a pregnancy. She reluctantly agrees. As Lakshmi is pregnant again, Ramarao's idea is to show her baby as that of Parvathamma to Badrinath and dissuade him from a second marriage. Ramaiah suspects infidelity on the part of Lakshmi and sends her out of the house. She takes shelter in Parvathamma's house, delivers a baby girl and is shocked to find Parvathamma and the baby missing from there. Ramaiah remarries to Durgi (Kanakam), who elopes with a stage actor after throwing her stepson Subbadu into a stream. Dejected, Lakshmi, who decides to end her life by jumping into the stream, finds her son and saves him with the help of a doctor (Dr. Damodaram). After Durga leaves him, Ramaiah turns into a sanyasi (ascetic). Years go by. Lakshmi's daughter Kamala (Vasantha), who is being brought up by Parvathamma, is now a young woman and is in love with Ramarao's son, Premnath (Janardanam). But Premnath's mother, who knows the truth, objects to her son marrying a maid's daughter. Subbadu is now Subbarao (K. S. Chalam), a lawyer of repute. After the story takes a few more turns and twists from here on all ends up well. Ramaiah returns home and the family is reunited.

Cast 

N. T. Rama Rao as Ramaiah 
C. Lakshmi Rajyam as Lakshmi 
S. V. Ranga Rao as Rama Rao 
Relangi as Narayana
Kasturi Siva Rao
Srivatsa Venkateswara Rao as Badrinath 
Doraswamy as Premnath
Santha Kumari as Parvathamma 
Suryakantham as Dr. Sarala
T. Kanakam as Durgi
T. D. Vasantha as Kamala
Pushpavalli

Soundtrack

Music composed by C. R. Subburaman & Susarla Dakshinamurthi. Lyrics were written by Acharya Aatreya.

References

External links

1952 films
1950s Telugu-language films
Films scored by Susarla Dakshinamurthi
Telugu films remade in other languages
Indian drama films
1952 drama films
Indian black-and-white films
Films scored by C. R. Subbaraman